Kevin Alexander Leon (born December 10, 1966), known professionally as Kevin de León and colloquially as KDL, is an American politician serving as the Los Angeles City Council member for District 14 since 2020. A member of the Democratic Party, he placed second in the 2018 United States Senate election in California against incumbent Senator Dianne Feinstein and third in the 2022 Los Angeles mayoral election.

From 2006 to 2010, de León represented the 45th district in the California State Assembly. He represented the 22nd state senate district from 2010 to 2014, and the 24th state senate district from 2014 to 2018. He was President pro tempore of the California State Senate from October 15, 2014 to March 21, 2018. Since October 2022, there have been widespread calls for his resignation after an audio recording of him and other council members making racist, homophobic, and derogatory remarks was leaked. He was formally censured by the City Council in a unanimous 12–0 vote on October 26, 2022. De León gained further notoriety when a video was released of the councilman involved in a physical conflict with an activist, in which de León "grabs [the activist] and throws him into a table."

Early life and education
Kevin Leon was born in Los Angeles, to Carmen Osorio and Andrés Leon. Both his parents were born in Guatemala with his father being of full or partial Chinese descent. His mother moved from Guatemala to Tijuana, Mexico in the 1960s. She moved to Los Angeles to work as a housekeeper. A single mother with two children, she met Leon's father who was largely absent. His mother married a man of Mexican descent, taking the name Carmen Osorio Núñez, and relocated to San Diego. She divorced and raised him in the Logan Heights neighborhood in San Diego. He also spent part of his youth in Tijuana where his stepfather's family was located. He strongly identifies with Mexican culture.

The first in his family to graduate from high school, he briefly attended the University of California, Santa Barbara before dropping out. He later earned a bachelor's degree from Pitzer College in 2003. While attending UC Santa Barbara, he began going by Kevin de León though he has never legally changed his name.

After dropping out of college, de León worked for One Stop Immigration Center, a nonprofit organization in Los Angeles that assists undocumented immigrants. He later became a labor organizer for the California Teachers Association, and campaign manager for Fabian Nuñez's campaign for California State Assembly in 2002. de León and Nuñez have been close political allies for most of their careers.

California State Assembly (2006–2010) 
De León first ran for office in 2006 defeating Christine Chavez, the granddaughter of labor leader Cesar E. Chavez, to replace the outgoing Jackie Goldberg as the California state assemblymember for the 45th district, covering Hollywood and much of Northeast Los Angeles.

In 2008, eyewitnesses on the floor of the state assembly observed de León casting a so-called ghost vote for assemblywoman Mary Hayashi on an affordable housing bill, opposite the way she would have voted, when Hayashi was away from the assembly floor. De León said he had no memory of the incident but also said he did not deny it, either. De León was investigated by then-state assembly speaker Karen Bass, but did not face any punishment and the vote was later changed. As a result of the controversy, Bass changed assembly rules to enforce a ban on ghost voting.

In 2009, de León was defeated in a bid to become speaker of the California state assembly, after many assembly members found de León's ambitious nature grating, eroding his support, according to reports in the Los Angeles Times.

California State Senate (2010–2018)
De León was elected to the California state senate in 2010 and became state senate president pro tempore in 2014. As a California state senator, De León has been generally regarded as a liberal and describes himself as a "proud progressive."

Energy and the environment

De León sponsored SB 100, which would have required the state of California to generate 50% renewable electricity by 2026 and 100% renewable electricity by 2045. In 2018, the bill passed both houses of the California state legislature and was signed into law by governor Jerry Brown on September 10.

In late 2017, de León was criticized for playing a role in killing a bill that would have blocked the controversial Cadiz Water Project, a proposal to mine and transfer groundwater from protected desert habitat in Eastern San Bernardino county to parts of Orange county. Opponents of the project blamed De León, then president pro tempore of the senate, and pointed out that the company behind the project had donated $5,000 to De León's political campaign. Fabian Nuñez, a close ally and donor to De León, also represented company as its lobbyist.

De León criticized the state's high-speed rail project, arguing that construction should have started in major cities like San Francisco and Los Angeles, rather than the state's Central Valley.

Gun control
De León is an advocate of gun control. In 2014, he sponsored SB 808, which addressed the personal fabrication of firearms. The bill was subsequently vetoed by governor Jerry Brown.

In 2016, De León led the charge in the passage of a package of 11 bills intended to prevent gun violence. These included De León's SB 1235, which created a new framework for buying and selling ammunition designed to address the ambiguities of his earlier SB 53, and his SB 1407, requiring a serial number from the California Department of Justice before building or assembling a gun.

Health care
De León is a supporter of creating a single-payer health care system. He promised to support senator Bernie Sanders's "Medicare for All" legislation if elected to the United States Senate. He supported SB 562, a proposed bill to create a single payer health care system in California, which stalled in 2017.

Gender equity 
De León authored SB 548, legislation that would make significant investments in child care, with a focus on empowering women in the workforce. The state budget resulted with new funding for thousands of more slots for subsidized child care.

In 2014, de León co-authored Yes Means Yes, the first law in the nation regarding affirmative consent and sought both to improve how universities handle rape and sexual assault cases and to clarify the standards, requiring an "affirmative consent" and stating that consent can't be given if someone is asleep or incapacitated by drugs or alcohol. "Lack of protest or resistance does not mean consent," the law states, "nor does silence mean consent." In 2015, de León co-authored follow-up legislation that requires public high schools teaching health education classes to include sexual assault prevention and strategies on how to build healthy peer relationships in their curricula.

2018 U.S. Senate election

On October 15, 2017, de León announced his bid for the United States Senate, challenging incumbent U.S. Senator Dianne Feinstein in the 2018 election. The following day a super PAC created by California political strategists Dave Jacobson and Maclen Zilber was formed to support his candidacy. On June 5, de León came in second place in the nonpartisan blanket primary with 12% of the total vote, enough to advance to the November general election. Feinstein received 44%, while the third place candidate, James Bradley, received 8% of the total vote. Republican candidates collectively received 33% of the vote.

De León's 12% was the lowest ever recorded for a candidate who advanced to the general election since California instituted its nonpartisan blanket primary rules in 2016. In July, De León won the endorsement of the California Democratic Party at their executive board meeting in Oakland. Despite the endorsement, however, De León's campaign faced fundraising struggles and low name recognition.

On November 6, 2018, Feinstein defeated De León 54.2% to 45.8%. The race had an undervote of around 1.3 million votes compared to the gubernatorial election, likely by Republican voters choosing not to cast a vote for either candidate.

Los Angeles City Council (2020–present) 
Prior to joining the Los Angeles City Council, de León was a senior analyst and distinguished policymaker-in-residence at the UCLA Luskin School of Public Affairs; as well as a Distinguished Fellow for Climate, Environmental Justice and Health with the USC Schwarzenegger Institute at the University of Southern California.

In 2020, de León was a candidate for a March special election to the Los Angeles city council. The seat had previously been vacated by José Huizar, who was the subject of an investigation into possible corruption charges. In June 2020, Huizar was arrested and charged with several counts of bribery and corruption. De León was elected in the special election to succeed him, and assumed office on October 15, 2020.

In 2021, de León advocated against SB 9, which would allow for the construction of duplexes in lots that are zoned as single-family home neighborhoods. The bill was intended to alleviate the severe housing shortage in California. That same year, de León sought to stall the construction of a rapid transit bus line through Eagle Rock, which prompted a critical editorial by the Los Angeles Times which characterized de León as a "spoiler."

In 2022, de León championed the "Clean Streets Now" plan, his plan to reduce illegal dumping throughout the city.
 Additionally, in the first ten months into his term, the City Council unanimously adopted De León's "25×25" plan– 25,000 units by the year 2025 – in order to help house those who are experiencing homelessness.

2022 Los Angeles City Council scandal 

In October 2022, de León apologized after an audio recording of a private 2021 meeting attended by himself, fellow Council member Gil Cedillo, Los Angeles County Federation of Labor President Ron Herrera, and Council president Nury Martinez came to light in which he made racist remarks about the adopted black son of their white City Council colleague Mike Bonin, comparing Bonin's treatment of his son to the way one handles a handbag. They also used slurs against indigenous Oaxacan people who live in Koreatown, and discussed redistricting in order to break up black voting districts, turning them into Latino ones through the process of gerrymandering. He compared black voices to the man behind the curtain in The Wizard of Oz, arguing that they are in fact weaker than they sound. The recording was leaked onto the internet and subsequently reported by the Los Angeles Times.

Calls for resignation and recall attempts 
In the aftermath of the City Hall controversy, dozens of prominent politicians and leaders called for de León's resignation, including President Joe Biden, Mike Bonin, and Southern California News Group opinion editor Sal Rodriguez. On October 19, in an interview with CBS Los Angeles, de León stated his adamant refusal to resign, claiming that his constituents need to be represented by him. He did not take responsibility so much for his own words as he did for his failure in having not put a stop to the conversation, and attempted to spin his joke comparing Bonin's son to a handbag as having been more of a joke about Martinez's penchant for luxury accessories than it was a racist one at the child's expense. Bonin has stated that he was, "really disappointed, and sort of disgusted" by the answers de León gave in the interview. He went on to say that de León had simply left him a voicemail, which did not amount to an apology. Other than that, de León has not spoken to Bonin since the recording was leaked. On October 26, the City Council unanimously voted 12–0 to formally censure de Léon along with Cedillo and Martinez for their actions.

Recall paperwork was filed by five of de León's constituents on October 27, 2022, with leadership problems and the racist audio leak cited as major reasons for recalling de León. Nury Martinez had faced a brief recall effort led by Alex Gruenenfelder prior to her resignation, and Gil Cedillo was too late in his tenure to be recalled. Prior to the scandal, there had been three unsuccessful attempts to recall de León, on the grounds of his failure to tackle homelessness and adequately support law enforcement. All four of these efforts were coordinated by Eagle Rock resident Pauline Adkins.

In December 2022, de León was involved in a fight with protestors at a community event. Video of the incident was subsequently released which showed that the physical altercation started when a community activist blocked de León while de León attempted to exit the building, and ending with de Leon's hands near the activist's neck as he pulled the activist down onto a table.

Personal life
De León lives in Los Angeles and has an adult daughter, Lluvia Carrasco. Carrasco's mother is San Jose councilmember Magdalena Carrasco. De León has never been married.

Electoral history

2018 U.S. Senate election

References

External links
Campaign website

Join California Kevin De Leon

|-

|-

|-

|-

1966 births
21st-century American politicians
Activists from California
American environmentalists
American gun control activists
American people of Guatemalan descent
American politicians of Guatemalan descent
California politicians of Chinese descent
Candidates in the 2018 United States Senate elections
Democratic Party California state senators
Democratic Party members of the California State Assembly
Hispanic and Latino American state legislators in California
Living people
Los Angeles City Council members
National Education Association people
Pitzer College alumni
Politicians from Los Angeles
Politicians from San Diego
Teachers of English as a second or foreign language
UCLA Luskin School of Public Affairs faculty